In mathematics, Dirichlet's unit theorem is a basic result in algebraic number theory due to Peter Gustav Lejeune Dirichlet. It determines the rank of the group of units in the ring  of algebraic integers of a number field . The regulator is a positive real number that determines how "dense" the units are.

The statement is that the group of units is finitely generated and has rank (maximal number of multiplicatively independent elements) equal to

As an example, if  is a quadratic field, the rank is 1 if it is a real quadratic field, and 0 if an imaginary quadratic field. The theory for real quadratic fields is essentially the theory of Pell's equation.

The rank is positive for all number fields besides  and imaginary quadratic fields, which have rank 0. The 'size' of the units is measured in general by a determinant called the regulator. In principle a basis for the units can be effectively computed; in practice the calculations are quite involved when  is large.

For a number field with at least one real embedding the torsion must therefore be only . There are number fields, for example most imaginary quadratic fields, having no real embeddings which also have  for the torsion of its unit group.

Totally real fields are special with respect to units. If  is a finite extension of number fields with degree greater than 1 and
The converse holds too. (An example is  equal to the rationals and  equal to an imaginary quadratic field; both have unit rank 0.)

The theorem not only applies to the maximal order  but to any order {{math|O ⊂ OK}}.

There is a generalisation of the unit theorem by Helmut Hasse (and later Claude Chevalley) to describe the structure of the group of -units, determining the rank of the unit group in localizations of rings of integers. Also, the Galois module structure of  has been determined.

The regulator

There will be  Archimedean places of K, either real or complex. Then the  matrixhas the property that the sum of any row is zero (because all units have norm 1, and the log of the norm is the sum of the entries in a row). This implies that the absolute value  of the determinant of the submatrix formed by deleting one column is independent of the column. The number  is called the regulator of the algebraic number field (it does not depend on the choice of generators ). It measures the "density" of the units: if the regulator is small, this means that there are "lots" of units.

The regulator has the following geometric interpretation. The map taking a unit  to the vector with entries  has an image in the -dimensional subspace of  consisting of all vectors whose entries have sum 0, and by Dirichlet's unit theorem the image is a lattice in this subspace.

The regulator of an algebraic number field of degree greater than 2 is usually quite cumbersome to calculate, though there are now computer algebra packages that can do it in many cases. It is usually much easier to calculate the product  of the class number  and the regulator using the class number formula, and the main difficulty in calculating the class number of an algebraic number field is usually the calculation of the regulator.

Examples

The regulator of an imaginary quadratic field, or of the rational integers, is 1 (as the determinant of a 0 × 0 matrix is 1).
This can be seen as follows. So the  matrix is 

Higher regulators

A 'higher' regulator refers to a construction for a function on an algebraic -group with index  that plays the same role as the classical regulator does for the group of units, which is a group . A theory of such regulators has been in development, with work of Armand Borel and others. Such higher regulators play a role, for example, in the Beilinson conjectures, and are expected to occur in evaluations of certain -functions at integer values of the argument. See also Beilinson regulator.

Stark regulator
The formulation of Stark's conjectures led Harold Stark to define what is now called the Stark regulator, similar to the classical regulator as a determinant of logarithms of units, attached to any Artin representation.

-adic regulator
Set 

Since  is a finite-index subgroup of the global units, it is an abelian group of rank . The -adic regulator is the determinant of the matrix formed by the -adic logarithms of the generators of this group. Leopoldt's conjecture'' states that this determinant is non-zero.

See also
Elliptic unit
Cyclotomic unit
Shintani's unit theorem

Notes

References
 

 

Theorems in algebraic number theory